Who I Am is the second studio album of American country music singer Jessica Andrews, released on February 27, 2001. Her breakthrough album, it produced her first and only Number One hit on the country charts in its title track; "Karma" and "Helplessly, Hopelessly" were also released as singles. The album itself received RIAA gold certification for sales of 500,000 copies.

The title track was featured on the Disney Channel TV show, Lizzie McGuire and was used as the theme song of the PAX series Sue Thomas F.B.Eye.

"I Don't Like Anyone" was also recorded by the pop girl group Dream for their debut album It Was All a Dream, also released in 2001.

Critical reception

Maria Konicki Dinoia reviewed the album for AllMusic and wrote, "Jessica Andrews delivers an impressive sophomore album. Upon first listen, it's easy to recognize her very maturing talent. Her vocals are strong and convincing, her songs are snappy and infectious, and there's little sign of her being just 17 years of age"

Richard Harrington of The Washington Post begins his review with, "ABOUT the only way you'd know for sure that Jessica Andrews is still a teenager is her favoring the word "awesome." The newly minted 17-year-old uses it to describe her feelings about "Who I Am" topping Billboard's country music singles chart (which it did for four weeks) and her similarly titled album rising as far as No. 2 and rapidly approaching platinum status."

Track listing

Personnel
Jessica Andrews – lead vocals, background vocals
Bekka Bramlett – background vocals
Mike Brignardello – bass guitar
Paul Franklin – steel guitar, Dobro
Aubrey Haynie – fiddle, mandolin
Michael Landau – electric guitar
B. James Lowry – electric guitar
Brent Mason – electric guitar
Jerry McPherson – electric guitar
Gene Miller – background vocals
Steve Nathan – piano, organ
Kim Parent – background vocals
Chris Rodriguez – background vocals
Biff Watson – acoustic guitar
Lonnie Wilson – drums
Glenn Worf – bass guitar

Chart performance

Weekly charts

Year-end charts

Singles

Certification

References

2001 albums
Albums produced by Byron Gallimore
Jessica Andrews albums
DreamWorks Records albums